Diaro Forsythe (born 11 January 2001) is a Sint Maartener international footballer who plays as a defender for FC Soualiga and the Sint Maarten national football team.

Career statistics

International

References

External links
 Diaro Forsythe at CaribbeanFootballDatabase

2001 births
Living people
Dutch Antillean footballers
Sint Maarten international footballers
Association football defenders